Victorian Dover Historic District is a national historic district located at Dover, Kent County, Delaware.  It encompasses 482 contributing buildings representative of the community's commercial, domestic and industrial development between the first quarter of the 19th century and the first quarter of the 20th century.  Notable buildings include the Wesley United Methodist Church (c. 1850), Whatcoat United Methodist Church (1871-1872), Dover's Railroad Station (1860s, 1911), Capitol Theatre (1903-1904), and Priscilla Block (1896). Located in the district is the separately listed John Bullen House.

It was added to the National Register of Historic Places in 1979.

References

Dover, Delaware
Queen Anne architecture in Delaware
Colonial Revival architecture in Delaware
Gothic Revival architecture in Delaware
Historic districts in Kent County, Delaware
Historic districts on the National Register of Historic Places in Delaware
National Register of Historic Places in Dover, Delaware